Amy Leach (born 14 April 1981) is a British theatre director.

Early life and career 
Amy Leach grew up in Darwen, Lancashire and attended the youth theatre at the Bolton Octagon Theatre. On graduating from Durham University, she co-founded the award winning theatre company for young people, en masse, with playwright and composer Oliver Birch. en masse toured nationally and internationally between 2003 & 2011. For en masse, she directed and produced UK tours of Spaceship ’87, The Echo Chamber (Fringe First Winner 2003), The Ignatius Trail (Fringe First Winner 2004), The Shelter, The Iceberg and We All Fall Down, as well as directing The Wonderful Wizard of Oz in co-production with the Dukes Theatre, Lancaster.

Career 

Leach is Associate Director of the Leeds Playhouse, where she led on the programming and ensemble company for the Pop-Up Season 2018–19. 

In early 2020, Amy will direct a brand new adaptation of Oliver Twist by Bryony Lavery for Leeds Playhouse and Ramps on the Moon. This production will feature and integrated company of D/deaf and disabled artists, feature integrated creative sign language, audio description and captioning at all performances, and tour to five venues across the UK.

Work 
Selected theatre productions
 The Night Before Christmas By Robert Alan Evans. The production returned to the Leeds Playhouse after a sell-out run in 2015. All performances where D/deaf friendly and featured the creative use of sign language.
 There Are No Beginnings by Charley Miles at Leeds Playhouse with Julie Hesmondhalgh, Natalie Gavin, Jesse Jones and Tessa Parr. Integrated audio description featured as part of every performance and the production was the venues first ever Parent & Baby Performance , allowing parents to enjoy a relaxed version of the play alongside their infants (under a year old).
 Hamlet by William Shakespeare at Leeds Playhouse with Tessa Parr, Simona Bitmate, Crystal Condie, Dan Parr, Darren Kuppan, Rob Pickavance, Susan Twist, Joeseph Alessi, Jo Mousley and 14 members of the Leeds Playhouse Youth Programme (2019).
 Kes Written by Barry Hines, adapted by Robert Alan Evans at Leeds Playhouse. This production was remounted by Associate Director Martin Leonard and performed by Jack Lord and Lucas Button (2019) This production was first created in Spring 2016 at Leeds Playhouse (formerly West Yorkshire Playhouse) performed by Jack Lord and Dan Parr. It was followed by a tour of community venues across Leeds.
 A Christmas Carol (November 2018–January 2019) Adapted by Deborah McAndrew From the novel by Charles Dickens at Leeds Playhouse - Pop-Up Theatre in association with Hull Truck Theatre. This production originally played at the Hull Truck Theatre in association with Hull City of Culture in Christmas 2017. 
 Road by Jim Cartwright at Leeds Playhouse - Pop-Up Theatre. This production featured live audio description at every show, performed in character by the cast (2018).
 Talking Heads by Alan Bennett ( A Cream Cracker Under the Settee & A Woman of No Importance ) Two of Alan Bennett's iconic monologues, performed at the West Yorkshire Playhouse as well as in homes across Leeds. These Talking Heads were presented alongside four others directed by James Brining and John R Wilkinson (2018).
 Queen of Chapeltown by Colin Grant at the West Yorkshire Playhouse with Elexi Walker, Emily Butterfield, Gabriel Paul, Benjamin Cawley & Raphael Bushay (2017).
 Romeo & Juliet by William Shakespeare at the West Yorkshire Playhouse, Quarry Theatre with Tessa Parr, Dan Parr, Elexi Walker, Lawrence Walker, Tachia Newall, Jack Lord, Natalie Anderson, Ciaran Kellgren, Keiran Flynn, Jeff Alexander, Olwen May, Susan Cookson and 31 members of Playhouse Youth (2017) .
 The Borrowers for the Sherman Theatre, Cardiff with Kezrena James, Cait Davis, Kieron Self, Harvey Virdi, Joseph Tweedale and Huw Blainey (Christmas 2016).
 Wonderman for NTW, WMC & Gagglebabble. Wonderman is a unique gig-theatre take on Roald Dahl's short stories for adults. It ran at the Edinburgh Fringe, Underbelly Potterrow in August 2016. It then played at the Tramshed, Cardiff as part of the City of the Unexpected to celebrate the centenary of Dahl's birth in September 2016. Finally, it played at WMC during Christmas 2016. 
 Little Sure Shot, Written and Composed by Lucy Rivers for the West Yorkshire Playhouse, The Egg Bath, Theatre Iolo and Mac Belfast. As part of this tour, it was also performed at nine community venues across Leeds as part of the WYP Community Tour Initiative (2015).
 The Caucasian Chalk Circle for The Unicorn, London (2015).

Other previous works include: The Life and Times of Mitchell and Kenyon for Dukes Theatre, Lancaster and Oldham Coliseum; Wanted! Robin Hood and Arabian Nights (MTA Winner for Best Ensemble 2012) for the Library Theatre Company at The Lowry; Sabbat, The Rise and Fall of Little Voice, Peter Pan and My Mother Said I Never Should for The Dukes; Dracula, Peter Pan, Wilde Tales, Oliver Twist, The Animated Tales of Shakespeare and The Grimm Brothers' Circus for Theatre Royal Bath/the egg; and Dr Korczak’s Example for the Royal Exchange in Manchester (MEN Award Winner for Best Studio Production 2008).

References
 "Amy Leach Appointed as New Associate Director of West Yorkshire Playhouse", Leeds Playhouse, March 2017.
 "Romeo and Juliet review – hot, hormonal inner-city tragedy". The Guardian, March 2017.
 https://www.thestage.co.uk/reviews/2017/christmas-carol-review-hull-truck-theatre/ December 2017, the Stage.
 https://www.thestage.co.uk/reviews/2019/hamlet-review-at-leeds-playhouse/ March 2019 , the Stage.
 "Leeds Playhouse And Ramps On The Moon To Stage New Adaptation Of Oliver Twist", Ramps on the Moon, June 2019.

External links 
En Masse Theatre Company

1981 births
English theatre directors
Living people
People from Darwen
British theatre directors
Women theatre directors
Alumni of Durham University